The 2021–22 BBL Championship of the 2021–22 BBL season, the 35th season of the British Basketball League started on 29 October 2021 to 24 April 2022.

On 6 April 2022, Leicester Riders were crowned league champions and won their 6th BBL Championship title.

Ladder 
The BBL Championship retained the three-game series format from the previous season, for a 27-game regular season, played across 24 Rounds between 29 October 2021 to 24 April 2022.

Standings

Games

Round 1

Round 2

Round 3

Round 4

Round 5

Round 6

Round 7

Round 8

Round 9

Round 10

Round 11

Round 12

Round 13

Round 14

Round 15

Round 16

Round 17

Round 18

Round 19

Round 20

Round 21

Round 22

Round 23

Round 24

References

External links

British Basketball League seasons
2021–22 in British basketball
Britain